The England women's cricket team played the India women's cricket team in April 2018. The tour consisted of three Women's One Day Internationals (WODIs). The matches followed a tri-series in India, which also featured the Australia women's cricket team. India won the series 2–1.

Unlike other WODI matches, these fixtures did not form part of the 2017–20 ICC Women's Championship. Instead, the fixtures were used to give India more match practice in the run-up to the 2021 Women's Cricket World Cup. Ahead of the WODI fixtures, England Women played a warm-up match against India A Women, with all four matches taking place in Nagpur.

During the first fixture, India's captain, Mithali Raj, played in her 192nd match, becoming the most capped player in WODIs. In the third and final match, she scored her 50th half-century in WODIs. It was the 56th time she had made a score of fifty or more, a new record in WODIs.

Squads

Ahead of the first match, Georgia Elwiss was added to England's squad, as cover for Heather Knight.

Tour match

50-over match: India A Women v England Women

WODI series

1st WODI

2nd WODI

3rd WODI

Notes

References

External links
 Series home at ESPN Cricinfo

Women's international cricket tours of India
2017–18 Indian women's cricket
India 2018
2018 in English women's cricket
2018 in women's cricket
International cricket competitions in 2017–18